August Mikkelsen (born 24 October 2000) is a Norwegian footballer who plays as an attacking midfielder or forward for Hammarby IF in Allsvenskan.

Club career

Tromsø
Mikkelsen played youth football for Tromsdalen UIL and Tromsø IL, and attended the Norwegian School of Elite Sport in Tromsø. He started his senior career in Tromsdalen, on loan in the summer and fall of 2018. In 2019, he was back in Tromsø and made his Eliteserien debut in May 2019 against Odd. He was also capped for Norway U19. In the 2020 1. divisjon he played semi-regularly for Tromsø, that won a promotion back to the top tier.

In 2021, Mikkelsen had his major breakthrough, scoring eight goals in 27 league appearances, as the newly-promoted side finished 12th in the table. On 9 December, after the last league fixture, Mikkelsen signed a new four-year contract with the club. He was one of three players nominated to win Eliteserien Young Player of the Year, but the award was eventually given to Mads Hedenstad Christiansen. Mikkelsen retained his fine form in 2022, scoring seven goals and providing five assists in 26 appearances, helping his side to finish 7th in the Eliteserien table. After the season, Mikkelsen was voted Tromsø Player of the Year by the supporters of the club.

Hammarby
On 25 January 2023, Mikkelsen transferred to Hammarby IF in Allsvenskan, signing a five-year contract. The transfer fee was reportedly set at around €2 Million, with potential bonuses included.

Career statistics

Club

References

2000 births
Living people
Sportspeople from Tromsø
Norwegian footballers
Tromsdalen UIL players
Tromsø IL players
Hammarby Fotboll players
Norwegian First Division players
Eliteserien players
Association football midfielders
Norway youth international footballers
Norwegian expatriate footballers
Expatriate footballers in Sweden
Norwegian expatriate sportspeople in Sweden